Salamone Rossi or Salomone Rossi (Salamon, Schlomo; de' Rossi) (ca. 1570 – 1630) was an Italian Jewish violinist and composer. He was a transitional figure between the late Italian Renaissance period and early Baroque.

Life
As a young man, Rossi acquired a reputation as a talented violinist. He was then hired (in 1587) as a court musician in Mantua, where records of his activities as a violinist survive.

Rossi served at the court of Mantua from 1587 to 1628 as concertmaster where he entertained the ducal family and their highly esteemed guests. The composers Rossi, Monteverdi, Gastoldi, Wert and Viadana provided fashionable music for banquets, wedding feasts, theatre productions and chapel services amongst others. Rossi was so well-thought of at this court that he was excused from wearing the yellow badge that was required of other Jews in Mantua.

Rossi probably died either in the invasion of Austrian troops, who defeated the Gonzagas and destroyed the Jewish ghetto in Mantua, or in the subsequent plague which ravaged the area.

Rossi's sister, Madama Europa, was an opera singer, and possibly the first Jewish woman to be professionally engaged in that area.  Like her brother, she was employed at the court in Mantua; she is thought to have performed in the intermedio Il Ratto di Europa, by Gabriello Chiabrera and Gastoldi, during the wedding festivities for Francesco Gonzaga in 1608. She also disappeared after the end of the Gonzaga court and subsequent sack of the ghetto.

Works

Italian
His first published work (released in 1589) was a collection of 19 canzonettes, short, dance-like compositions for a trio of voices with lighthearted, amorous lyrics. Rossi also flourished in his composition of more serious madrigals, combining the poetry of the greatest poets of the day (e.g. Guarini, Marino, Rinaldi, and Celiano) with his melodies. In 1600, in the first two of his five madrigal books, Rossi published the earliest continuo madrigals, an innovation which partially defined the beginning of the Baroque era in music; these particular compositions included tablature for chitarrone.

Rossi published 150 secular works in Italian, including:

Canzonette a 3, Libro primo
 I bei ligustri, for 3 voices
 Correte amanti, for 3 voices
 S'el Leoncorno, for 3 voices

Madrigali a 5, Libro primo
 Cor Mio, madrigal for 5 voices
 Dir mi che piu non ardo, madrigal for 5 voices

Instrumental
In the field of instrumental music Rossi was a bold innovator. He was one of the first composers to apply to instrumental music the principles of monodic song, in which one melody dominates over secondary accompanying parts. His trio sonatas, among the first in the literature, provided for the development of an idiomatic and virtuoso violin technique. They stand midway between the homogeneous textures of the instrumental canzona of the late Renaissance and the trio sonata of the mature Baroque.

Works published, and preserved today include:
 Il primo libro delle sinfonie e gagliarde a 3–5 voci (1607)
 Il secondo libro delle sinfonie e gagliarde a 3–5 voci (1608)
 Il terzo libro de varie sonate, sinfonie (1613)
 Il quarto libro de varie sonate, sinfonie (1622)

Hebrew
Rossi also published a collection of Jewish liturgical music, השירים אשר לשלמה (Ha-shirim asher li-Shlomo, The Songs of Solomon) in 1623. This was written in the Baroque tradition and (almost) entirely unconnected to traditional Jewish cantorial music. This was an unprecedented development in synagogal music. The biblical Song of Solomon does not appear within The Songs of Solomon, hence the name is probably a pun on Rossi's first name (Rikko 1969). Rossi set many Biblical Hebrew texts to music in their original Hebrew language, which makes him unique among Baroque composers. His vocal music resembles that of Claudio Monteverdi and Luigi Rossi, but its lyrics are in Hebrew.

Milnes Vol. I
Adon 'olam (8v) piyyut — Boston Camerata
Barekhu (3v) prayer — Profeti della Quinta (2009), Boston Camerata
Ein keloheinu (8v) piyyut
Elohim hashivenu Ps. 80:4, 8, 20 — Profeti della Quinta (2009)
Haleluyah. Ashrei ish yare et Adonai (8v) Ps. 112 
Haleluyah. Haleli nafshi (4v) Ps. 146
Haleluyah. Ode Adonai (8v) Ps. 111
Hashkivenu (5v) prayer — Profeti della Quinta (2009)
Keter yitenu lakh (4v) Great kedusha — Profeti della Quinta (2009)
Lamnatseah binginot mizmor shir (3v or 4v) Ps. 67
Mizmor le'Asaf. Elohim nitsav (3v) Ps. 82
Mizmor leDavid. Havu l'Adonai (6v) Ps. 29
Mizmor shir leyom hashabat (8v) Ps. 92
Shir hama'a lot. Esa'einai (5v) Ps. 121
Yigdal Elohim hai (8v) piyyut
Yitgadal veyitkadesh (3v and 5v) Full kaddish — 5v by Profeti della Quinta (2009)
Milnes Vol. II
'Al naharot Bavel (4v) Ps. 137 — Profeti della Quinta (2009)
Barukh haba beshem Adonai (6v) Ps. 118:26–29 — Boston Camerata
Eftah na sefatai (7v) piyyut
Eftah shir bisfatai (8v) piyyut — Boston Camerata,
Ele mo'adei Adonai (3v) Lev. 23:4
Lamnatseah 'al hagitit (5v) Ps. 8 — Profeti della Quinta (2009)
Lamnatseah 'al hasheminit (3v) Ps.12
Lemi ehpots (8v) Wedding ode — Profeti della Quinta (2009)
Mizmor letoda (5v) Ps. 100
Odekha ki'anitani (6v) Ps. 118:21–24
Shir hama'a lot. Ashrei kol yere Adonai (3v, 5v and 6v) Ps. 128
Shir hama'a lot. Beshuv Adonai (5v) Ps. 126
Shir hama'a lot leDavid. Lulei Adonai (6v) Ps. 124
Yesusum midbar vetsiya (5v) Isaiah 35:1–2, 5–6, 10

Recordings
Rossi, S: Il terzo libro de varie sonate, sinfonie, gagliarde, brandi e corrente, Op. 12 Il Ruggiero, Emanuela Marcante Tactus 2012
Rossi: (1) Vocal Works, (2) Madrigals, (3) Canti di Salomone. 3 CDs licensed from Tactus Records Italy to Brilliant Classics, Netherlands. BLC 93359
Madrigaletti op. XIII - Ensemble L'aura soave. Diego Cantalupi TC.571802 2000
Primo libro di madrigali a 4 voci - Arie a voce sola dal I Libro dei Madrigali a 5 voci - Ut Musica Poësis Ensemble Director: Stefano Bozolo TC.571803 2001
Canti di Salomone a 3 parti - Sonata e Salmi di Henry Purcell - Mottetto di André Campra - Ensemble Hypothesis Director: Leopoldo d'Agostino TC.571804 2003
The Songs of Solomon. Corvina Consort dir. Zoltan Kalmanovits, Hungaroton 2006
The Songs of Solomon, Volume 1: Music for the Sabbath. Pro Gloria Musicae PGM 108
The Songs of Solomon, Volume 2: Holiday and festival music Jewish sacred music from 17th-century Italy by Salamone Rossi, New York Baroque, dir. Eric Milnes. Troy, NY: Dorian, 2001
The Song of Solomon and Instrumental Music. Profeti della Quinta, Ensemble Muscadin.  ℗2008, ©2009. Pan Classics PC 10214. Includes  libretto with Hebrew texts
Rossi: Il mantovano hebreo Profeti della Quinta Vol.2 Elam Rotem Linn 2013
Salomone Rossi Ebreo: A Jewish Composer in 17th Century Italy Ensemble La Dafne, Stefano Rossi Release Date: 9th Feb 2018 GB5638 Bongiovanni
Rossi, S: The Two Souls of Solomon Ensemble Daedalus, Roberto Festa Accent
Salamone Rossi Hebreo Boston Early Music. dir. Prof. Joshua R. Jacobson
Salomone Rossi - Illumine Our Hearts Sursum Corda. MSR Classics. 2010-02-09
on collections
Musique judéo-baroque. Boston Camerata, dir. Joel Cohen. LP: ℗1979. CD: Arles: Harmonia mundi, ℗1988. Harmonia mundi France HMA 1901021
Jewish Baroque Music of Rossi, Lidarti, Caceres. Ensemble Salomone Rossi. Concerto CTO 2009
'Salamone Rossi Hebreo Mantovano': Siena Ensemble, directed by Michelene Wandor. Vocal and instrumental music. Classical Recording Company (London) 2002.
Sacred Bridges.The King's Singers and Sarband. Signum Classics SIGCD065 2005

References

Sources
Birnbaum, Eduard (1978) Jewish musicians at the court of the Mantuan dukes, 1542–1628, Tel Aviv : Tel Aviv University, Faculty of Fine Arts, School of Jewish Studies, 1978, c. 1975
James Haar, Anthony Newcomb, Glenn Watkins, Nigel Fortune, Joseph Kerman, Jerome Roche: "Madrigal", in The New Grove Dictionary of Music and Musicians, ed. Stanley Sadie. 20 vol. London, Macmillan Publishers Ltd., 1980. 
Harran, Don (2003). Salamone Rossi: Jewish Musician in Late Renaissance Mantua. Oxford University Press. 332 pages. 
Nettl, Paul and Theodore Baker (1931). "Some Early Jewish Musicians" in The Musical Quarterly, Vol. 17, No. 1. (Jan., 1931), pp. 40–46. ISSN 0027-4631
Patuzzi, Stefano, Music from a Confined Space: Salomone Rossi's "Ha-shirim asher liShlomoh" (1622/23) and the Mantuan Ghetto, in "Journal of Synagogue Music" (Sacred Space), ed. by Joseph A. Levine, Fall 2012, volume 37, pp. 49–69.
Patuzzi, Stefano, I Canti di Salomone Rossi e l'"invenzione" della musica ebraica, in Lombardia Judaica, ed. by Giulio Busi and Ermanno Finzi, Florence, Giuntina, 2017, pp. 39–48.
Rikko, Fritz (1969). "Salamon Rossi, Hashirim Asher L'shlomo (The Songs of Solomon)" in The Musical Quarterly, Vol. 55, No. 2 (Apr., 1969), pp. 269–275
Jacobson, Joshua R. (2016) "Salamone Rossi Renaissance Man of Jewish Music" Berlin: Hentrich & Hentrich,  (Jüdische Miniaturen Bd. 196)
Seroussi, Edwin (2004) "On the Footsteps of the 'Great Jewish Composer'": Review-Essay of Don Harrán’s Salamone Rossi: Jewish Musician in Late Renaissance Mantua. In Min'ad: Israel Studies in Musicology Online 3.

External links

Zamir Chorale of Boston: main page about Salamone Rossi
Jewish Encyclopedia
Salamone Rossi on JewishChoralMusic.com
Audio: Al Naharot Bavel (By the Rivers of Babylon), Psalm 137, from The Songs of Solomon.
Salomone Rossi and his innovations An Early Music Sources educational video describing Rossi's influence on music of his time, including audio examples

Renaissance composers
Italian Baroque composers
Italian male classical composers
Jewish classical composers
Jewish classical violinists
16th-century Italian Jews
1570s births
1630 deaths
17th-century Italian composers
Male classical violinists
17th-century Italian Jews
17th-century male musicians